Satya Narayan Sinha (9 July 1900 – 26 July 1983) was an Indian National Congress politician who served as the Minister of Parliamentary Affairs. He was the first Leader of the House in Lok Sabha not to be a prime minister.

Details
Satya Narayan Sinha was born in Sambhupatti Samastipur in a Rajput family. He was elected to the Lower house of the Indian Parliament the Lok Sabha in 1952 from Samastipur East, 1957  and 1962 from Samastipur and in 1967 from Darbhanga in Bihar, India.

Sinha served as Minister for Parliamentary Affairs and Communications from 1964 to 1967, and as Minister for Health, Family Planning and Urban Development from 1967 to 1971. He was appointed Governor of Madhya Pradesh in 1971, and served in this role until 1977. He died on 26 July 1983, aged 83.

References

External links
 Official biographical sketch in Parliament of India website

1900 births
1983 deaths
India MPs 1952–1957
India MPs 1957–1962
India MPs 1962–1967
India MPs 1967–1970
Civil aviation ministers of India
Governors of Madhya Pradesh
Health ministers of India
Leaders of the Lok Sabha
Lok Sabha members from Bihar
Members of the Bihar Legislative Council
Members of the Cabinet of India
Members of the Constituent Assembly of India
Ministers for Information and Broadcasting of India
People from Darbhanga district
Indian National Congress politicians from Bihar